Chuchur is a hamlet in the municipality of Smolyan, located in the Smolyan Province of southern Bulgaria. The village is located 177.9 km from Sofia. As of 2007, the village had a population of 6 people.

References

Villages in Smolyan Province